Jacques Longueval (18 March 1680 – 14 January 1735) was a French Jesuit priest, theologian, scholar and historian of the Catholic Church in France.

Biography 

Jacques Longueval was born on 18 March 1680 in Péronne, France.
He entered the Jesuit novitiate on 17 September 1699. 
He taught grammar and humanities classes from 1700 to 1707 at the colleges of Amiens and La Flèche.
Then he taught theology from 1719 to 1728, before retiring to the Professed House house in Paris, where he gathered documentation and did research for his Histoire de l’Église gallicane (History of the Gallican Church).

In recognition of his work, the Assembly of the French clergy granted him, in 1730, an annual pension of 500 pounds and a gratuity of 2,500 pounds. 
Unfortunately, a stroke took him into his fifty-fourth year, while he was in the process of completing the 8th volume.
Longueval died on 14 January 1735 in Paris.
He had almost put the finishing touches to the 9th and 10th volumes. 
Fathers Pierre-Claude Fontenai, Pierre Brumoy and Guillaume-François Berthier continued the eleventh and following volumes of the monumental work, which ran to 18 volumes. 
Among his papers is a History of Pelagianism, which was his first work.

Écrits 

  (8vo)
  (8vo)

Notes

Sources

1680 births
1735 deaths
18th-century French historians